Deryck J. van Rensburg (born c. 1960) is a South African, British and U.S. business executive and academic. He is the dean of the Graziadio Business School at Pepperdine University.

Early life
Van Rensburg was born circa 1960 in South Africa. He graduated from Rhodes University and the University of South Africa, where he earned bachelor's degrees. He earned a master of business administration from the University of Bath followed by a doctor of business administration from the University of Manchester.

Career
Van Rensburg worked for Unilever and The Coca-Cola Company for three decades. In his last role he was President of Global Ventures for Coca-Cola reporting to the Chairman and CEO.

Van Rensburg has served as the dean of Pepperdine University's Graziadio Business School since November 2016. He has published academic articles in Management Decision, the Journal of Business Strategy, the International Entrepreneurship and Management Journal, and Industrial Marketing Management.

Personal life
Van Rensburg has a wife, Rozanne, three sons and a daughter.

References

Living people
1960s births
South African emigrants to the United States
Rhodes University alumni
University of South Africa alumni
Alumni of the University of Bath
Alumni of the University of Manchester
Coca-Cola people
Pepperdine University faculty
Business school deans